William Donald McNeil (21 January 1906 – 16 May 1964) was an Australian politician.

He was born in Adelaide. In 1959 he was elected to the Tasmanian House of Assembly as a Labor member for Wilmot in a countback following the death of Reg Fisher. Re-elected in 1959, he was appointed a minister in 1961. Defeated at the election on 2 May 1964, he died fourteen days later at St Marys.

References

1906 births
1964 deaths
Members of the Tasmanian House of Assembly
Politicians from Adelaide
Australian Labor Party members of the Parliament of Tasmania
20th-century Australian politicians